Dudua aprobola, the mango flower webworm or litchi leaf roller, is a moth of the family Tortricidae. The species was first described by Edward Meyrick in 1886. It is a pest on several economically important crops.

Distribution
It is found in Taiwan, Japan, the Seychelles, Nepal, India, the Chagos Archipelago, Sri Lanka, the Maldives, Myanmar, Vietnam, Thailand, western Malaysia, Sumatra, Java, Bali, Brunei, Kalimantan, the Philippines, Sulawesi, Buru, Ambon, New Guinea, the D'Entrecasteaux Islands, Australia, the Admiralty Islands, New Ireland, the Caroline Islands, the Gilbert Islands, Fiji, Tonga, Samoa, Réunion, Malawi and Rwanda.

Description
Adult wingspan is about 19 mm. The female lays eggs between veins on the undersides of leaves of the food plant. The caterpillar is translucent yellowish green. First two pairs of legs are black. The larvae roll or web the leaves of the food plant together, feeding on them within this shelter. They sometimes live in flowers. Pupation takes place inside a rolled leaf, which is lined by a thin layer of silk. The pupation period lasts one to two weeks. Adult has pale brownish forewings with various dark markings. Hindwings are plain brown. On thorax region, there is a crest of dark scales.

Larval food plants
Anacardium sp.
Arachis hypogaea
Bidens pilosa
Calophyllum inophyllum
Cassia tora
Dahlia sp.
Eucalyptus sp.
Eugenia jambos
Ficus sp.
Flemingia macrophylla
Lagerstroemia speciosa
Lagerstroemia sp.
Lantana camara
Litchi chinensis
Loranthus sp.
Mangifera indica
Metrosideros collina
Metrosideros villosa
Nephelium litchi
Plumbago zeylanica
Polyalthia longifolia
Psidium guajava
Rosa sp.
Salix tetrasperma
Schleichera trijuga

Control and management
Adults and caterpillars can be controlled by hand picking and pruning. Egg and larval parasitoids are also effective. Pesticides and use of Bacillus thuringiensis extracts are effective against caterpillars.

References

External links
Eurasian Tortricidae
Prevalence of some threatening pests and disease of Litchi (Litchi chinensis Sonn.) in Bihar state of India
Field efficacy of insecticides and integrated pest management modules against litchi leaf roller, Dudua aprobola
Diversity and economic status of Lepidopteran insect-pest on two major varieties of mango
Development of chemical control against the leaf webber, Dudua aprobola (Meyr.) on litchi

Olethreutini
Moths of Japan
Moths of Seychelles
Moths of Réunion
Moths of Asia
Moths of Sub-Saharan Africa
Moths described in 1886